World Series Rugby was a series of rugby union exhibition matches played in 2018 between the Perth-based Western Force and opposition teams from the Asia-Pacific region. It was the forerunner of Global Rapid Rugby, which commenced in 2019. World Series Rugby was created after the Western Force team was axed from the Australian Super Rugby conference at the end of the 2017 season.

Teams

Fixtures

May–June

July–August

Country Stockman tour
Following the 2018 World Series Rugby season, the Australian Country Stockman Rugby team  undertook a two match tour to Perth to play the Western Force and Western Force Under-19 sides.

References

External links
 Western Force Webpage
 2018 Schedule
 Force vs Australian Stockman Rugby

World Series Rugby
World Series Rugby
2018 in Australian rugby union